The Kiss is a 2003 direct-to-video film starring Francoise Surel, Eliza Dushku, Terence Stamp, and Billy Zane. It tells the story of a book editor (Surel) who is entranced by a certain old manuscript about a romance. Unfortunately, she discovers that the story is unfinished, so with her roommate (Dushku) she attempts to find the author, only to be disappointed that he (Stamp) is nothing more than a broken man after his wife's death. The editor forms a close friendship with him, and they find the meaning of true love.

Cast
 Francoise Surel as Cara Thompson
 Eliza Dushku as Megan
 Terence Stamp as Philip Naudet
 Billy Zane as Alan Roberts
 Illeana Douglas as Joyce Rothman
 William Mapother as Peter
 Steven Gilborn as Mumford

External links 
 

2003 romantic comedy films
2003 direct-to-video films
2003 films
Films directed by Gorman Bechard
2000s English-language films